Andrés Artuñedo and Roberto Carballés were the defending champions.
Andrew Harris and Nick Kyrgios won the title by defeating Adam Pavlásek and Václav Šafránek in the final, 6–4, 2–6, [10–7]

Seeds

Draw

Finals

Top half

Bottom half

References
 Main Draw

Boys' Doubles
2012